

Headline events of the year
The Chicago Cubs became the first Major League Baseball franchise to install a music organ for fan entertainment. It was one of the only innovations ever to be introduced at Wrigley Field, which 47 years later earned a backward reputation as the last ballpark to install lights.
Joe DiMaggio hits in 56 consecutive games. After being hitless in the 57th game, he hit safely in 16 more consecutive games for a streak of 72 of 73 games.
Ted Williams ended the season with a .406 batting average.  No hitter (qualifying for the batting title) has hit over .400 since the 1941 season.

Champions

Major League Baseball
World Series: New York Yankees over Brooklyn Dodgers (4-1)
All-Star Game, July 8 at Briggs Stadium: American League, 7-5

Other champions
IV World Cup of Baseball: Venezuela
Negro League Baseball All-Star Game: East, 8-3

Awards and honors
MLB Most Valuable Player Award
Joe DiMaggio, New York Yankees, OF
Dolph Camilli, Brooklyn Dodgers, 1B
The Sporting News Most Valuable Player Award
Joe DiMaggio, New York Yankees, OF
Dolph Camilli, Brooklyn Dodgers, 1B
The Sporting News Player of the Year Award
Ted Williams (AL) – OF, Boston Red Sox
The Sporting News Manager of the Year Award
Billy Southworth (NL) – St. Louis Cardinals

MLB statistical leaders

Major league baseball final standings

American League final standings

National League final standings

Negro league baseball final standings

Negro American League final standings

Negro National League final standings

Washington won first half; Cubans won second half.
Washington beat New York 2 games to 0 games in a play-off.

Events

January
 January 8 – The BBWAA announces in The Sporting News the poll names for the 1940 All-Star team: Hank Greenberg‚ LF; Joe DiMaggio‚ CF; Ted Williams‚ RF; Frank McCormick‚ 1B; Joe Gordon‚ 2B; Luke Appling‚ SS; Stan Hack‚ 3B; Harry Danning‚ C. The pitchers are Bob Feller‚ Bucky Walters‚ and Paul Derringer.
 January 21 – Bob Feller signs with the Cleveland Indians for a reported $30,000.

February
 February 25 – Days after the start of spring training, the New York Yankees sell Babe Dahlgren to the Boston Braves.

March
March 8 – Philadelphia Phillies pitcher Hugh Mulcahy becomes the first Major League Baseball player drafted into the Armed Forces in the draft established by President Roosevelt in anticipation of World War II. More than 100 major leaguers will be drafted within the next two years, and two of them, Washington Senators outfielder Elmer Gedeon and Philadelphia Athletics catcher Harry O'Neill, will be killed in action.
March 23 – New York Yankees outfielder Joe DiMaggio, a hold out and late arrival in spring training, plays his first Grapefruit League game.

April
April 13 – In the final pre-season tune-up game, the New York Yankees win their 3rd game in a row over the host Brooklyn Dodgers at Ebbets Field, 3-0. The Dodgers had come into this final series with an 11-game winning streak, including four games against the Yankees at their training camp.
April 15 – Shortstop Lou Stringer made four errors in his debut with the Chicago Cubs, setting a National League record for a player in his first game. Stringer does better on offense, adding a pair of hits and two runs batted in. Chicago beat the Pittsburgh Pirates, 7–4, backed by strong pitching from starter Claude Passeau and a clutch home run by Bill Nicholson. Besides, the win is the first for Jimmie Wilson while making his managerial debut.
April 20 :
At the Polo Grounds, the New York Giants attracted an attendance of 56,314, to date the biggest crowd ever to view a single game, even though they lost to the Brooklyn Dodgers, 10–9.
The Brooklyn Dodgers became the first club in Major League Baseball history to wear a protective headgear, as each player cap featured a special plastic lining designed to fend off the effects of beanballs. It was a cautious response to the numerous beanball wars of the 1940 season which saw hospitalized players such as Joe Medwick and Billy Jurges, among others. Nevertheless, the liners in the caps are thin enough to be hardly noticeable, so most players disdained the protection.

May
 May 15 –  In the first inning, Joe DiMaggio of the New York Yankees singles against the Chicago White Sox to start his 56-game hitting streak.
 May 20 – Chicago White Sox outfielder Taft Wright set an American League record after driving in at least one run in thirteen consecutive games. During the streak, Wright recorded 22 runs batted in although in six of the games he drove in a run without collecting a hit.

June
 June 1 – Mel Ott's two-run homer, the 400th of his career and his 1,500th RBI, gives the New York Giants a 3–2 win over the Cincinnati Reds.
 June 6 – The New York Giants became the first team in Major League history to use plastic batting helmets during a doubleheader against the Pittsburgh Pirates. Although the Giants batters appeared comfortable in their new headgear at the plate, they still went on to lose both games by scores of 5–4 and 4–3.

July
 July 8 – At the All-Star Game at Detroit's Briggs Stadium, Boston's Ted Williams, hitting .405 at the break, homers off Chicago Cubs pitcher Claude Passeau with 2 outs and 2 on in the 9th inning to give the American League a dramatic 7-5 victory. Williams' 4 RBIs are matched by National League shortstop Arky Vaughan, who hits home runs in the 7th and the 8th.
 July 16 – Joe DiMaggio's hitting streak ends at 56 games against the Cleveland Indians.
July 25 – Lefty Grove of the Boston Red Sox earns his 300th career win, which is also his last.

August
August 19 – Pittsburgh Pirates manager Frankie Frisch was ejected from the second game of a double header after appearing on the field waving an umbrella to protest the playing conditions at Ebbets Field, home of the Brooklyn Dodgers. As a result, American artist Norman Rockwell later transformed the humorous argument into a famous oil painting titled Bottom of the Sixth.
August 30 – Lon Warneke pitches a no-hitter, leading the St. Louis Cardinals to a 2–0 victory over the Cincinnati Reds.

September
 September 17 – 20-year old Stan Musial makes his major league debut with the St. Louis Cardinals.
 September 28 – Entering the last day of the season, Ted Williams of the Boston Red Sox was hitting .3995, which would have been good for a .400 average.  However, Williams decided to play in both games of a double-header at Shibe Park against the Philadelphia Athletics to make it completely legitimate; he would go 6 for 8 in the two games to leave his average at .406.  It remains the last time any player has hit .400 in a season.
 September 29 – The Fort Custer team won the national amateur championship of the American Baseball Congress with a 3–2 victory over the Charlotte, North Carolina, team. It was the last time the amateur World Series was held until after the war.

October
October 6 – The New York Yankees defeat the Brooklyn Dodgers, 3-1, in Game 5 of the World Series to win fifth title in six years, and their ninth overall, four games to one.

November
November 25 – Cleveland Indians shortstop Lou Boudreau is named as the new team manager. Boudreau takes over for Roger Peckinpaugh, who moves up to the front office as the Indians general manager. At age 24, Boudreau became the youngest player to manage a team in the 20th century. Jim McCormick, the first ballplayer born in Scotland to appear in a major league game, managed Cleveland in 1879 at age 23.
November 27 – in a controversial vote, Joe DiMaggio of the New York Yankees is named American League MVP over Ted Williams of the Boston Red Sox (291 points for DiMaggio, 254 for Williams). DiMaggio, who set a 56-game hitting streak record in the season, batted .357 with 30 home runs and led the AL in RBI (125), while Williams finished even stronger to close the season with a majors leading .406 average and 120 RBI, while leading the American League in home runs (37), runs (135), OBP (.553) and SLG (.735). Both the 56-game hitting streak and the .400 plateau have not been touched since.

December
 December 2 – The New York Giants name Mel Ott as their new manager, replacing Bill Terry, who moves up as the head of the Giants Minor League Baseball system.
 December 7 – The secret vote by the AL owners to move the St. Louis Browns franchise to Los Angeles, scheduled for the week of December 8, is thwarted by the Japanese attack on Pearl Harbor on Sunday, December 7, thereby plunging the U.S. into World War II and keeping the Browns in St. Louis for another dozen seasons.

Births

January
January 3 – John Sullivan
January 16 – Joe Bonikowski
January 18 – Mickey McGuire
January 22 – Dave Leonhard
January 27 – Nick Willhite

February
February 5 – Roberto Rodríguez
February 11 – Sammy Ellis
February 12 – Mike Joyce
February 13 – Jim Brenneman
February 17 – Dave Wissman
February 18 – Leo Marentette
February 20 – Clyde Wright
February 23 – Ron Hunt
February 23 – Gordy Lund
February 25 – Dave Vineyard
February 26 – George Kopacz

March
March 5 – Phil Roof
March 7 – Glen Clark
March 17 – Vic Voltaggio
March 18 – Pat Jarvis
March 20 – Pat Corrales

April
April 1 – Dick Kenworthy
April 4 – Eddie Watt
April 13 – John Stephenson
April 14 – Frank Cipriani
April 14 – Pete Rose
April 21 – Dick Green
April 22 – Steve Jones
April 25 – Chuck Harrison

May
May 2 – Clay Carroll
May 5 – Tommy Helms
May 10 – Ken Berry
May 12 – Floyd Weaver
May 19 – Mike Lee
May 21 – Bobby Cox
May 24 – Bill Wakefield
May 27 – Dan Ardell
May 29 – John Kennedy
May 30 – John Miller

June
June 1 – Dean Chance
June 2 – Bob Saverine
June 5 – Duke Sims
June 12 – Gerry Arrigo
June 13 – Marcel Lachemann
June 15 – Bruce Dal Canton
June 18 – Paul Brown
June 20 – Luis Alcaráz
June 26 – Gil Garrido
June 28 – Len Boehmer
June 28 – Al Downing
June 28 – Fred Talbot
June 29 – John Boccabella
June 29 – Larry Stahl

July
July 3 – Casey Cox
July 8 – Gary Kroll
July 8 – Ken Sanders
July 12 – Dick Rusteck
July 13 – Don Bryant
July 21 – Nelson Mathews
July 21 – Gary Waslewski
July 22 – Bart Zeller
July 26 – Carroll Sembera
July 30 – Bob Barton

August
August 6 – Ray Culp
August 9 – Paul Lindblad
August 13 – Jim French
August 15 – Tommie Reynolds
August 16 – Gene Brabender
August 16 – Bill Edgerton
August 16 – Larry Loughlin
August 17 – Boog Powell
August 19 – Fred Lasher
August 23 – Marty Martínez
August 23 – John Morris
August 26 – Fred Wenz
August 30 – Carmen Fanzone
August 30 – Archie Moore

September
September 2 – Jerry Crider
September 4 – Ken Harrelson
September 4 – Bernie Smith
September 11 – Larry Bearnarth
September 15 – Jim Barbieri
September 18 – Dick Dietz
September 20 – Dennis Ribant
September 29 – Jeff James
September 29 – Rich Reese

October
October 5 – Andy Kosco
October 9 – Jeoff Long
October 13 – Jim Price
October 14 – Art Shamsky
October 16 – Tim McCarver
October 21 – Ron Davis
October 22 – Wilbur Wood
October 30 – Jim Ray Hart
October 31 – Ed Spiezio

November
November 2 – Billy Connors
November 5 – Rudy Schlesinger
November 7 – Clarence Jones
November 13 – Mel Stottlemyre
November 14 – Darrell Sutherland
November 18 – Sterling Slaughter
November 25 – Mike Ryan
November 26 – Jeff Torborg
November 27 – Al Raffo
November 28 – Fritz Fisher
November 29 – Bill Freehan

December
December 5 – Bob Sprout
December 7 – Rupe Toppin
December 8 – Ed Brinkman
December 9 – Darold Knowles
December 11 – Dámaso Blanco
December 12 – Allan Lewis
December 16 – Adolfo Phillips
December 21 – Paul Casanova
December 23 – Ken Hubbs
December 27 – Phil Gagliano
December 29 – Bruce Brubaker
December 29 – John Upham

Deaths

January
January 6 – Charley O'Leary, 58, shortstop for the Detroit Tigers, St. Louis Cardinals and St. Louis Browns between 1904–1913 (plus a one-game cameo in 1934), who coached for 21 years with the Cardinals (1913–1917), New York Yankees (1921–1930), Chicago Cubs (1931–1932) and Browns (1934–1937).
January 20 – Jack Lelivelt, 55, outfielder for the Senators, Highlanders, Yankees and Naps from 1909–1914, who also set an International League record with a 42-game hitting streak in 1912, which was broken by Brandon Watson in 2007.
January 24 – Tommy Bond, 84, Irish 19th century pitcher who posted a 234-163 record for six different clubs from 1874 to 1884, and also was the first Triple Crown winner in 1877, while leading the National League with 40 wins, 170 strikeouts, and a 2.11 ERA.
January 25 – Chris Lindsay, 62, first baseman who played from 1905 to 1906 with the Detroit Tigers.
January 28 – John Johnson, 71, pitcher for the 1894 Philadelphia Phillies.

February
February 2 – Ambrose McGann, 73, infielder/outfielder for the 1895 Louisville Colonels.
February 8 – Frank Beck, 79, pitcher who played for the Pittsburgh Alleghenys and Baltimore Monumentals during the 1884 season.
February 10 – Eddie Boyle, 66, catcher for the Louisville Colonels and Pittsburgh Pirates in the 1890s.
February 17 – Happy Iott, 64, outfielder for the 1903 Cleveland Naps.
February 18 – Tom Connelly, 43, backup outfielder for the New York Yankees in 1920 and 1921.
February 21 – Frank Corridon, 60, pitcher who played from 1904 to 1910 for the Cubs, Phillies and Cardinals, who is credited with being the first major league pitcher to use the spitball.
February 23 – Lou Kolls, 48, American League umpire, 1933 until his death; worked 1,195 league games, 1936 All-Star Game and 1938 World Series; former pro football player.
February 28 – Wilson Collins, 51, outfielder for the Boston Braves from 1913 to 1914.

March
March 1 – Ivey Wingo, 50, catcher for the St. Louis Cardinals  and the Cincinnati Reds in part of 17 seasons spanning 1911–1929, who hit .571 as a member of the 1919 World Series Champions Reds.
March 3 – Doc Parker, 68, pitcher for the Chicago Colts and Cincinnati Reds between the 1893 and 1901 seasons.
March 8 – Buzz Wetzel, 46, pitcher for the 1927 Philadelphia Athletics and a minor league player/manager who in 1921 guided the London Tecumsehs to the Michigan-Ontario Baseball League championship.
March 10 – Doc Hazleton, 64, first baseman for the 1902 St. Louis Cardinals.
March 11 – Pi Schwert, 47, catcher for the New York Yankees from 1914 to 1915.
March 25 – Eddie Hickey, 68, third baseman for the 1901 Chicago Orphans.
March 31 – Kit McKenna, 68, pitcher who played from 1898 to 1899 for the Brooklyn Bridegrooms and Baltimore Orioles.

April
April 4 – Alex Jones, 71, pitcher for the Alleghenys, Colonels, Senators, Phillies and Tigers from 1889 to 1903.
April 13 – Germany Schultz, 47, outfielder from 1912–1925 for every National League club with the exception of the New York Giants; later a minor league manager and MLB executive; son Joe Jr. was a major league coach with four clubs and manager of the 1969 Seattle Pilots.
April 16 – Howard Wakefield, 57, catcher who played from 1905-07 with the Cleveland Indians and Washington Senators.

May
May 1 – Roxy Snipes, 44, pinch-hitter for the 1923 Chicago White Sox.
May 8 – Bill Joyce, 75, third baseman for five teams in eight seasons from 1890–1898 and manager of the New York Giants from 1896 through 1898, who tied for the National League home runs title with Ed Delahanty in 1896 and finished second three times.
May 10 – Jim Pastorius, 59, pitcher from 1906 to 1909 for the Brooklyn Superbas.
May 15 – William Lackey, 70, pitcher for the 1890 Philadelphia Athletics.
May 16 – Art Williams, 63, first baseman/outfielder for the 1902 Chicago Orphans.
May 17 – Bill Husted, 74, pitcher for the 1890 Philadelphia Athletics.
May 19 – Joe Gedeon, 47, second baseman for the Washington Senators, New York Yankees and St. Louis Browns from 1913 to 1920, who led the American League batters with 48 sacrifice hits in 1920, and was one of the eight players suspended for life as result of the Black Sox Scandal.
May 19 – John Schulze, 75, catcher for the 1891 St. Louis Browns.
May 23 – Jack Clements, 76, left-handed catcher for six different teams between 1884 and 1900, who caught 1,073 games and also is credited with being the first catcher to wear a chest protector.
May 25 – Bob Higgins, 54, catcher who played from 1909 to 1912 for the Cleveland Naps and Brooklyn Dodgers.

June
June 2 – Lou Gehrig, 37, Hall of Fame first baseman who played from 1923 through 1939 for the New York Yankees, a two-time Most Valuable Player and Triple Crown winner, as well as the second player to hit 400 home runs, who retired to end a record 2,130-game playing streak upon being diagnosed with the terminal illness that now bears his name.
June 3 – Andy Cooper, 43, pitcher for the Negro leagues' Detroit Stars and Kansas City Monarchs.
June 16 – Mike Flynn, 69, Irish catcher who played in one game with the Boston Reds of the American Association.
June 23 – Bill Nelson, 77, pitcher for the 1884 Pittsburgh Alleghenys.

July
July 1 – Harry Adams, 78, umpire both in the National League and American League.
July 3 – Tom McCreery, 66, pitcher/outfielder for five different teams from 1895 to 1903, who is the only player in Major League history to hit three inside-the-park home runs in a single game.
July 4 – Bruce Petway, 55, Negro leagues catcher in the early 20th century who came to be known as having one of the best throwing arms in the league.
July 6 – Jack Theis, 49, pitcher for the 1920 Cincinnati Reds.
July 6 – Lucky Wright, 61, pitcher for the 1909 Cleveland Indians.
July 7 – Jack Gilbert, 65, outfielder who played with the Washington Senators and New York Giants in the 1898 season and for the Pittsburgh Pirates in 1904.
July 8 – Jack Wadsworth, 73, pitcher who played for the Cleveland Spiders, Baltimore Orioles and Louisville Colonels in part of four seasons spanning 1890–1895.
July 15 – Clarence Currie, 62, pitcher who played from 1902 to 1903 with the Cincinnati Reds, St. Louis Cardinals and Chicago Cubs.
July 15 – Frank Isbell, 65, valuable utility man who played in all nine positions for the Chicago White Sox during 10 seasons 1901 to 1909.
July 17 – Rube Kisinger, 64, pitcher for the 1902–1903 Detroit Tigers, who also led the Buffalo Bisons to their first Eastern League pennant in 1904.
July 20 – Ralph Kreitz, 55, catcher form the 1911 Chicago White Sox.
July 30 – Howie Shanks, 51, who played in all infield and outfield positions from 1912 through 1925 for the Washington Senators, New York Yankees and Boston Red Sox.
July 30 – Mickey Welch, 82, Hall of Fame pitcher and the third hurler in Major League history to reach 300 victories, preceded only by Pud Galvin and Tim Keefe, who on August 28, 1884, struck out the first nine batters he faced to set a record that has remained untouched, while collecting at least 20 wins in nine seasons, including 17 consecutive wins in 1885 en route to a 44-11 record.
July 31 – Jim Byrnes, 61, catcher for the 1906 Philadelphia Athletics.

August
August 8 – Ralph Works, 53, pitcher who played from 1909 through 1912 for the Detroit Tigers and Cincinnati Reds.
August 15 – Jacob Doyle, 85, outfielder for the 1872 Washington Nationals.
August 26 – Stoney McGlynn, 69, pitcher for the 1906-08 St. Louis Cardinals

September
September 8 – Joe Boehling, 50, pitcher who posted a 55-50 record and a 2.97 ERA in part of seven seasons from 1912–1920 for the Washington Senators and Cleveland Indians.
September 23 – Tom Morrissey, 81, third baseman for the Detroit Wolverines in 1881 and the Milwaukee Brewers in 1884.
September 24 – Lou Castro, 64, Colombian second baseman for the 1902 Philadelphia Athletics, who is regarded as the first Latin player to appear in a Major League game.
September 27 – Monte Pfeffer, 49, infielder for the 1913 Philadelphia Athletics.
September 29 – John B. Foster, 78, sportswriter and editor of The Spalding Guide.
September 30 – John McPherson, 72, pitcher who played with the Philadelphia Athletics in the 1901 season and for the Philadelphia Phillies in 1904.

October
October 3 – Bert Inks, 70, 19th century pitcher who played from 1891 to 1896 for six different clubs, mainly with the Louisville Colonels.
October 4 – Walt Justis, 58, pitcher for the 1905 Detroit Tigers.
October 13 – George Proeser, 77, who pitched with the Cleveland Blues in 1888 and served as an outfielder for the Syracuse Stars in 1890.
October 24 – Emmett Rogers, 71, catcher for the 1890 Toledo Maumees.
October 25 – Bill Phillips, pitcher for the Pittsburgh Alleghenys and the Cincinnati Reds of the National League in seven seasons between 1890 and 1903, who is best remembered for managing the 1914 Indianapolis Hoosiers to the Federal League pennant.
October 29 – Harvey Hendrick, 43, infielder/outfielder who hit .308 for seven different teams between 1923 and 1934.
October 29 – Wilbur Murdoch, 66, outfielder for the 1908 St. Louis Cardinals.

November
November 5 – Varney Anderson, 75, pitcher for the Indianapolis Hoosiers and Washington Senators from 1889 to 1896.
November 9 – Fred Worden, 47, pitcher for the 1914 Philadelphia Athletics.
November 12 – Ernie Koob, 49, pitcher for the St. Louis Browns from 1915–1919, who threw a no-hitter against the Chicago White Sox on May 5, 1917.
November 15 – Bill Karns, 65, pitcher for the 1901 Baltimore Orioles.
November 18 – Charlie Kalbfus, 76, outfielder for the 1884 Washington Nationals.
November 19 – Davey Dunkle, 69, pitcher for the Phillies, Senators and White Sox from 1897 to 1904.
November 24 – John Henry, 51, catcher for the Washington Senators and Boston Braves from 1910 to 1918.
November 27 – Rudy Schwenck, 57, pitcher for the 1909 Chicago Cubs.
November 29 – Ed Hahn, 66, outfielder for the New York Yankees and Chicago White Sox from 1905 to 1910.

December
December 9 – Ed Mars, 75, pitcher for the 1890 Syracuse Stars of the American Association.
December 13 – Roy Witherup, 55, pitcher who played for the Boston Beaneaters and Washington Senators in a span of four seasons between 1906 and 1909.
December 14 – George Gillpatrick, 66, pitcher for the 1898 St. Louis Browns of the National League.
December 16 – Bill Garfield, 74, pitcher who played with the Pittsburgh Alleghenys in 1889 and for the Cleveland Spiders in 1890.
December 25 – George Bell, 67, pitcher who played from 1907 through 1911 for the Brooklyn Superbas and Dodgers clubs.
December 28 – Jack Hickey, 60, starting pitcher who appeared in two games for the 1904 Cleveland Naps.

References

External links

Baseball Reference – 1941 MLB Season Summary  
Baseball Reference – 1941 births
Baseball Reference – 1941 deaths